The Central line of the Mumbai Suburban Railway is a public transit system serving Mumbai, Maharashtra, India. It consists of 24 stations from Chhatrapati Shivaji Maharaj Terminus (formerly Victoria Terminus) to Kalyan Junction. The entire line is at grade. It has section of quadruple track starting from Chhatrapati Shivaji Maharaj Terminus and ends at Kasara, Roha, Uran and Khopoli in Maharashtra.

The Central line in Mumbai consists of three major corridors, which bifurcate as they run into suburban satellite towns.
Two corridors (one local and other through) on Central Railway run from CSMT to Kalyan Junction (55 km), from where it bifurcates into two lines – one running up to Kasara (67 km) in the north-east and the other running up to Khopoli (61 km) in the south-east. These two corridors constitute the 'Main' Line. The Central main line shares one station with the Western line at Dadar. They consist of a fleet of DC as well as dual-powered EMUs.

The major car sheds on this line are at Kurla and Kalva. There are fast and slow locals here for suburban service. Slow locals halt at every station, while fast locals halts vary between Byculla, Dadar, Kurla, Ghatkopar, Vikhroli, Bhandup, Mulund, Thane, Diva, Dombivli and Kalyan Junction. All services plying beyond this junction run slow.  Trains usually start from and terminate at important stations.

Routes
The Central line consists of the following routes:
 CSMT-Kasara
 CSMT-Khopoli
 CSMT-Roha
 CSMT-Uran

Stations
Names in bold indicate that the station is a fast train stop as well as important terminal.

Main line

†A footbridge links Parel to Prabhadevi on the Western line.

Main Line Branches

The main line of the Mumbai Suburban Railway runs from CSMT to Kalyan. It then splits into two corridors one going to Khopoli and other to Kasara.

South-east Section

Proposed station

North-east Section

Vasai Road–Diva–Panvel line

The Vasai Road–Bhiwandi Road-Diva–Panvel–Roha line connects the Western line station of Vasai Road with the Harbour line station of Panvel. It intersects the main line of the Central line at Diva. MEMUs operate between Dahanu Road and Roha via a branch line from Diva.

Nerul/CBD Belapur–Uran line

The Nerul/CBD Belapur–Uran rail track of 27 km is currently under construction. The line is being constructed by CIDCO at a cost of 14.12 billion. It is expected to be operational by 2015.

The proposed railway stations are as follows:

History
The first passenger train in India from Chhatrapati Shivaji Terminus in Mumbai to Thane ran on 16 April 1853 on the track laid by the Great Indian Peninsula Railway. The GIPR line was extended to Kalyan in 1854 and then on the north-east side to Igatpuri and the south-east side to Khopoli via Palasdari railway station at the foot of the Western Ghats in 1856.

Electrification
Railway electrification in India began with the first electric train, between Bombay Victoria Terminus and Kurla by the Great Indian Peninsula Railway (GIPR) on 3 February 1925, on 1.5 kV DC. The Kalyan–Pune section was electrified with 1.5 kV DC overhead system in 1930.

The previously used 1.5 kV DC was converted to 25 kV AC on 5 May 2013 from Kalyan to Khopoli and Kalyan to Kasara. Conversion from 1.5 kV DC to 25 kV AC on the Lokmanya Tilak Terminus-Thane-Kalyan section was completed on 12 January 2014. The CSMT to LTT section was converted from 1.5 kV DC to 25 kV AC on 8 June 2015.

Services
Since November 2011, all services on the Central line have been running on 12 cars. In preparation for introducing 15 car services, CR extended platforms at Byculla, Kurla, Ghatkopar, Bhandup, Mulund and Dombivli stations, from the current 270 metres to 330 metres, in order to accommodate 15 coach trains. The first 15-car service, on the Central line, departed from Chhatrapati Shivaji Terminus to Kalyan at 7:33 pm on 16 October 2012.

As of March 2014, 75 rakes operate 825 services on the Central line daily, of which 809 are 12-car and 16 are 15-car services.

See also
 Mumbai Suburban Railway
 List of Mumbai Suburban Railway stations
 Central Railway

References

Rail transport in Mumbai
Transport in Kalyan-Dombivli
Transport in Thane
Mumbai Suburban Railway lines
Railway lines opened in 1853
Transport in Mumbai
Transport in Navi Mumbai
Transport in Vasai-Virar